LGBT community centers are safe meeting places for all people.  Prior to the gay liberation movement, there were no LGBT community centers in the United States.  They became popular in the 1980s following activism to combat HIV/AIDS in the LGBT community.  By 2009, there were at least 150 throughout the country.

Arkansas 
 Little Rock — Center for Artistic Revolution

California
 Berkeley — Pacific Center for Human Growth
 Los Angeles — Los Angeles LGBT Center
 San Francisco — SF LGBT Center
 San Francisco — Queer Cultural Center
 San Jose — Billy DeFrank Lesbian, Gay, Bisexual and Transgender Community Center

Florida
 Fort Lauderdale — The Pride Center at Equality Park

Georgia
 Atlanta — Atlanta Gay Center (now closed)

Illinois
 Chicago — Center on Halsted

Maryland
 Baltimore — Pride Center of Maryland

Michigan
 Ann Arbor — University of Michigan Spectrum Center
 Detroit — LGBT Detroit, Ruth Ellis Center
 Ferndale — Affirmations

Minnesota
 Minneapolis — Queer Student Cultural Center

Missouri
 St. Louis — Lesbian Gay Bi Transgender Community Center of Metropolitan St. Louis (now closed)

Nevada
 Las Vegas — The Gay and Lesbian Community Center of Southern Nevada

New Mexico
 Albuquerque — MPower

New York
 Kingston/Hudson Valley — Hudson Valley LGBTQ Community Center
 New York City — Lesbian, Gay, Bisexual & Transgender Community Center
 New York City — Ali Forney Center
 New York City — Callen-Lorde Community Health Center

Ohio
 Columbus — Stonewall Columbus

Oklahoma 
 Tulsa — Oklahomans for Equality

Oregon
 Portland — Q Center

Pennsylvania
 Allentown — Bradbury-Sullivan LGBT Community Center
 Philadelphia — Mazzoni Center
 Philadelphia — William Way LGBT Community Center

Texas
 Houston — Montrose Center

Utah
 Salt Lake City — Utah Pride Center

Vermont
 Burlington — Pride Center of Vermont

Wisconsin
 Milwaukee — Project Q

See also
 List of LGBT-related organizations and conferences

References

 
community centers in the United States